A Light Woman is a 1920 American silent drama film directed by George L. Cox and starring Helen Jerome Eddy, Hallam Cooley, and Claire Du Brey.

Cast
 Helen Jerome Eddy as Doris Kane
 Hallam Cooley as Paul Evans
 Claire Du Brey as Jeanne DuPre
 Charles Clary as 	Thomas Evans
 Guy Milham a 	Hal Foster
 Frances Raymond as The Mother

References

Bibliography
 Connelly, Robert B. The Silents: Silent Feature Films, 1910-36, Volume 40, Issue 2. December Press, 1998.

External links

 

1920s American films
1920 films
1920 drama films
1920s English-language films
American silent feature films
Silent American drama films
American black-and-white films
Films directed by George L. Cox
Pathé Exchange films